Cleburne may refer to:

Places
Cleburne, Texas
Cleburne County, Alabama
Cleburne County, Arkansas

People with the surname
Patrick Cleburne, Irish Confederate general

See also
City of Cleburne v. Cleburne Living Center, Inc.